The Brighton and Hove Built-up area or Brighton/Worthing/Littlehampton conurbation has a population of 474,485 (2011 census), making it England's 12th largest conurbation. This was an increase of around 3% from the 2001 population of 461,181. Named the Brighton/Worthing/Littlehampton conurbation by the Office for National Statistics for the 2001 census and Brighton and Hove Built-up area for the 2011 census, the area has also been known as Greater Brighton, although the Greater Brighton City Region that was created in 2014 from 7 local authorities in Sussex covers a much larger area. The conurbation dominates West and East Sussex, with around 1 in 3 of Sussex's population living within its boundaries.  It is also the second largest conurbation in the South East region of England and the second largest conurbation on the English Channel coast, in either England or France. In both of these cases the Brighton conurbation trails the Southampton and Portsmouth conurbation. The Brighton/Worthing/Littlehampton  conurbation was the largest on the Channel before Portsmouth and Southampton's conurbations were combined for much official data analysis after the 2011 census.

This conurbation is also the UK's most densely populated major conurbation outside London with 5304 people per km². This is due to its tight boundaries between the South Downs national park to the north, and the English Channel to the south together with less land devoted to domestic gardens in English seaside towns than in inland towns.

It is a multi-centred conurbation and the eastern part, the city of Brighton and Hove, has approximately half of its population.

Places in the conurbation
The total distance in a straight line from the western edge of Littlehampton to the eastern edge of Saltdean is between 23 and 24 miles. Along the shore or by road, it is slightly further.

The conurbation's population is made up of the following settlements as defined by the Office for National Statistics:

Notes:
 Hove and Brighton were separate subdivisions for the 2001 census but are combined in one Brighton and Hove subdivision for the 2011 census.
 In the 2011 census the Shoreham subdivision includes Sompting and Lancing.
 Findon was not included as part of the Brighton and Hove built-up area for the 2011 census.
 Saltdean and Rottingdean were not included as part of the Brighton and Hove built-up area for the 2011 census and instead form a built-up area called Saltdean/Woodingdean with a population of 22,729.
 In the 2001 census the Littlehampton subdivision included Angmering and Ferring. In the 2011 census the Littlehampton subdivision still includes Angmering but Ferring is part of the Worthing subdivision.

There are some small gaps that help maintain distinct identities of places in the conurbation, although in places the settlements coalesce:
 Goring Gap between Ferring and Goring/Worthing
 Sompting Gap between Worthing and Sompting
 Brooklands Park between Worthing and Lancing
 Lancing Gap between Lancing and Shoreham

Nearby places
Settlements very close to the conurbation but not included in the official statistics include the towns of Peacehaven (separated from Brighton by Telscombe Tye, a small open space), Newhaven (joined to Peacehaven, population 11,000) and Seaford (separated from Newhaven by the River Ouse, population 22,000).

Climate
The coastal towns of Sussex with neighbouring Hampshire and south Kent including the settlements that make up the Brighton and Hove built-up area are the sunniest places in the United Kingdom. The coast has consistently more sunshine than the inland areas: sea breezes, blowing off the sea, tend to clear any cloud from the coast. The sunshine average is approximately 1,900 hours a year; this is much higher than the UK average of 1,340 hours a year.

See also
List of conurbations in the United Kingdom

References

Geography of Sussex
Brighton and Hove
Adur District
Worthing
Littlehampton
Geography of West Sussex
Geography of East Sussex
Brighton\Worthing\Littlehampton